Fort Sheridan may refer to:

 Camp Sheridan (Nebraska), an abandoned Army post sometimes called Fort Sheridan
 Fort Logan, a former military post in Denver, Colorado formerly named Fort Sheridan
 Fort Sheridan, Illinois, a residential neighborhood in Lake County, Illinois
 Fort Sheridan Forest Preserve, a forest preserve operated by the Lake County Forest Preserves
 Fort Sheridan Historic District, a National Historic Landmark District in Fort Sheridan, Illinois
 Fort Sheridan station, a commuter rail station in Fort Sheridan, Illinois
 Sheridan Reserve Center, an Army Reserve installation in Fort Sheridan, Illinois